The red garra (Garra rufa), also known as the doctor fish or nibble fish, is a species of cyprinid that is native to a wide range of freshwater habitats in subtropical parts of Western Asia.

In the wild, Garra rufa feed on detritus, algae and tiny animals (arthropods and zooplankton). Since the early 21st century, this fish has been integrated into a spa treatment where they feed on the stratum corneum skin layer of patients with psoriasis. While the doctor fish treatment has been found to alleviate the symptoms of psoriasis, the treatment is not curative, and no cure for psoriasis currently exists. The use of the fish as a spa treatment for the wider public is still widely debated on grounds of efficacy and validity.

Distribution, habitat and taxonomy
As traditionally defined, Garra rufa is native to Turkey, The Levant, Iraq and Iran. Some of the main systems where it is found are the Kızıl, Seyhan, Ceyhan, Orontes, Queiq, Jordan, Tigris–Euphrates, Kor, and Mond river basins, but the species also inhabits other coastal river basins in the Levant and Iran, as well as the endorheic Lake Maharlu system.  It lives in rivers, streams, canals, reservoirs, ponds and lakes, although it tends to avoid stagnant waters. It often is common or abundant, even in areas that are heavily influenced by humans like polluted canals.

The taxonomy of this species has been labelled with uncertainty. As traditionally defined (sensu lato), there are some morphological variations over its relatively large range and it has been recognized for several years that it likely was a species complex. Several subspecies have been described, but their validity is questionable and in the last few decades authorities have generally not recognized them. Nevertheless, reviews published since 2014 have provided genetic and morphologic evidence for recognizing some of them as separate species, while other new species have been described from the species complex. This includes G. turcica (formerly a subspecies) from its Turkish range, except the Tigris–Euphrates system, G. jordanica (new species) from the northern Dead Sea basin, including the Jordan River, in Israel, Jordan and Syria, G. gymnothorax (formerly a subspecies) from the Karun, Balarud and Bashar systems in Iran, G. mondica (new species) of the Mond River basin in Iran, and G. amirhosseini (new species) from the Sartang-e-Bijar Spring in the Tigris River system in Iran. G. jordanica and G. turcica have entirely separate ranges from true G. rufa (thus limiting its range to the Tigris–Euphrates system and river systems in Iran), but the others do overlap in range with true G. rufa or at least occur in the same river basins.

Other members of the G. rufa complex are G. barreimiae, G. elegans, G. ghorensis, G. longipinnis, G. nana, G. persica, G. rossica and G. sahilia, but these were generally recognized as valid species many years ago. Finally the complex includes four cavefish: G. lorestanensis, G. tashanensis, G. typhlops and G. widdowsoni.

Relationship with humans

Doctor fish facilities at spa resorts exist in many countries worldwide. In 2006, doctor fish spa resorts opened in Kangal, Turkey, Hakone, Japan, and Umag, Croatia, where the fish are used to clean the bathers at the spa. In 2008, two widely known doctor fish pedicure services were opened in the United States in Alexandria, Virginia, and in Milwaukee, Wisconsin. Wisconsin ordered the closure of the doctor fish service shortly after its opening. In 2010, the first spa opened in the United Kingdom in Sheffield. In 2011, the UK Health Protection Agency issued a report assigning a "very low" risk of transferring infection from the procedure.

The practice is banned in several of the states in the United States and Canadian provinces as cosmetology regulators believe the practice is unsanitary, with the Wall Street Journal saying that "cosmetology regulations generally mandate that tools need to be discarded or sanitized after each use. But epidermis-eating fish are too expensive to throw away". The procedure is legal in Quebec, with a few clinics in Montreal. The animal rights organization People for the Ethical Treatment of Animals (PETA), which opposes all human use of animals, denounces the practice, citing callous methods of international transportation and suggesting that the fish are deliberately starved between treatments to force them to eat an abnormal food.

Garra rufa seen in the spa and aquarium trade mostly originate from commercial facilities in Israel and to a lesser degree Turkey. Since Israeli and many (but not all) Turkish populations of "G. rufa" now are recognized as G. jordanica and G. turcica instead, this leads to questions over the true identity of most of the fish seen in the trade. It is legally protected from capture from the wild in Turkey due to concerns of overharvesting. Despite its ability to survive in polluted waters, the species requires clean, well-oxygenated and moving waters to thrive in an aquarium. For treatment of skin diseases, aquarium specimens are not well-suited as the skin-feeding behavior fully manifests only under conditions where the food supply can be scarce and unpredictable.

See also
 Cleaner fish

References

Garra
Animal-assisted therapy
Freshwater fish of Asia
Fish of Western Asia
Fish described in 1843
Taxa named by Johann Jakob Heckel